The 1959 Richmond Spiders football team was an American football team that represented the University of Richmond as a member of the Southern Conference (SoCon) during the 1959 NCAA University Division football season. In their ninth season under head coach Ed Merrick, Richmond compiled a 4–5–1 record, with a mark of 4–3–1 in conference play, finishing in fifth place in the SoCon.

Schedule

References

Richmond
Richmond Spiders football seasons
Richmond Spiders football